The 2018 Asia Pacific Masters Games, the inaugural edition of the Asia Pacific Masters Games, also known as Penang 2018, was held in the Malaysian state of Penang from 7 to 15 September 2018. Organised by the International Masters Games Association (IMGA), it is the first ever Masters Games for the Asia-Pacific region.

The multi-sport event is open to participants of all abilities and most ages – the minimum age criterion ranges between 25 and 35 years depending on the sport. There are no competition qualification requirements apart from the age requirement and membership in that sport's governing body.

Host city 
Penang was selected as the host of the inaugural edition of the Asia Pacific Masters Games during a bidding process in Nice, France in 2015.

Venues 

18 venues within Penang's four districts were utilised in the Asia Pacific Masters Games. Most of the venues for the event are situated around Penang's capital city, George Town on Penang Island.

Northeast Penang Island
City Stadium-Athletics (Track and field), Opening ceremony
Downtown UNESCO Zone-Cycling (Criterium), Athletics (Half marathon)
Gurney Drive to Teluk Bahang-Cycling (Road race)
Penang Lebuh Macallum Table Tennis Training Centre-Table tennis
SRK Jalan Residensi-Archery
Penang Sports Club-Tennis
Penang Rifle Club-Shooting
Hard Rock Hotel-Volleyball (beach)
Dumbar Hill Penang Water Supply Corporation Badminton Hall-Badminton
Nicol David International Squash Centre-Squash
Universiti Sains Malaysia (Island Campus)-Netball, Softball, Football, Hockey, Tennis, Volleyball (Indoor)
Penang Golf Club, Bukit Jambul-Golf
Relau City Sports Complex-Swimming
Relau Agro Agriculture Centre-Cycling (Mountain bike)

Southwest Penang Island
SPICE Arena-Basketball, Lion dance, Pencak silat, Taekwondo, Wushu, Closing ceremony

Central Seberang Perai
Mega Lanes Bowling Centre-Bowling
Seberang Perai Arena-Weightlifting

South Seberang Perai
Bukit Jawi Golf Resort-Golf

Mascot 
CUN the cat, symbolizing "Capable, United and Noble", was the official mascot of the 2018 Games.

Sports 
The inaugural edition of the Asia Pacific Masters Games in 2018 will include 22 sports.

 Archery (16) - 125 participants from 12 countries
 Athletics (467) - 1300 participants from 37 countries
 Badminton (138) - 538 participants from 21 countries
 Cycling (43) - 466 participants from 13 countries
 Golf (18) - 107 participants from 9 countries
 Pencak silat (38) - 95 participants from 5 countries
 Shooting (2) - 52 participants from 3 countries
 Squash (61) - 111 participants from 13 countries
 Swimming (500) - 306 participants from 27 countries
 Table tennis (96) - 277 participants from 16 countries
 Taekwondo (25) - 69 participants from 9 countries
 Tennis (69) - 131 participants from 21 countries
 Tenpin bowling (80) - 135 participants from 7 countries
 Weightlifting (49) - 83 participants from 14 countries
 Wushu (70) - 197 participants from 17 countries

Team Sports:

 Basketball (204) - 245 participants from 9 countries
 Football (152) - 484 participants from 12 countries
 Hockey (162) - 157 participants from 9 countries
 Lion dance (40) - 110 participants from 8 countries
 Netball (28) - 138 participants from 7 countries
 Softball (30) - 109 participants from 3 countries
 Volleyball (150) - 199 participants from 15 countries

 Note: Volleyball consist of Beach Volleyball too.

Results 
Source:

 Archery: 
 Athletics: https://d3tfdru9q5sbcz.cloudfront.net/2019/11/APMG-2018-Athletics.pdf
 Badminton: https://d3tfdru9q5sbcz.cloudfront.net/2019/11/APMG-2018-Badminton.pdf
 Basketball: https://d3tfdru9q5sbcz.cloudfront.net/2020/09/APMG-2018-Basketball.pdf
 Beach volleyball: https://d3tfdru9q5sbcz.cloudfront.net/2020/09/APMG-2018-Beach-Volleyball-All-Results.pdf
 Cycling:
 Football:
 Golf:
 Hockey: https://d3tfdru9q5sbcz.cloudfront.net/2019/11/APMG-2018-Field-Hockey.pdf
 Lion dance:
 Netball: https://d3tfdru9q5sbcz.cloudfront.net/2019/11/APMG-2018-Netball.pdf
 Pencak silat:
 Shooting:
 Softball:
 Squash: https://d3tfdru9q5sbcz.cloudfront.net/2019/11/APMG-2018-SQUASH-final-results.pdf
 Swimming: https://d3tfdru9q5sbcz.cloudfront.net/2019/11/APMG-2018-Swimming.pdf
 Table tennis: https://d3tfdru9q5sbcz.cloudfront.net/2019/11/APMG-2018-Table-Tennis.pdf
 Taekwondo:
 Tennis:
 Ten-pin bowling:
 Volleyball: https://d3tfdru9q5sbcz.cloudfront.net/2020/09/APMG-2018-INDOOR-VB-RESULT-All-Results.pdf 
 Weightlifting: https://d3tfdru9q5sbcz.cloudfront.net/2020/09/All-Weightlifting.pdf
 Wushu:

Medals
Source page 70 and 77:
There should not be any medal table or results in the article as Master games are not like the Olympics. As mentioned in the rules of IMGA, there are no national delegation and all participants compete individually.

Total 5,846 Podium medals (G,S,B) and 1,180 finishers medals (in Road cycling and road athletics events) in all age group.

 2438 Gold
 1850 Silver
 1558 Bronze
 5846 Total

Participating nations

Below are the countries of origin of the participating athletes. Note that there are no national delegations in Masters Games, as the athletes compete on their own.

Summary
Source event report page 6 and 75:

A total of 5601 participants:

3328 athletes from Malaysia (59.4%).

2273 athletes from 66 other countries (40.6%).

4,073 men (73%) and 1,528 women (27%).

Ages
 Under 20: 25 persons
 20-29: 55 persons
 30-39: 1346 persons
 40-49: 1748 persons
 50-59: 1420 persons
 60-69: 745 persons
 70-79: 220 persons
 Over 80: 42 persons

Top
  (3328)
  (385)
  (296)
  (240)
  (179)

Asia Pacific

Asia (30)

 (1)
 (2)
 (13)
 (179)
 (102)
 (73)
 (385)
 (48)
 (240)
 (20)
 (52)
 (2)
 (12)
 (host) (3328)
 (135)
 (35)
 (1)
 (52)
 (5)
 (2)
 (113)
 (64)
 (1)
 (5)
 (22)
 (6)
 (1)

Pacific (7)

 (296)
British Indian Ocean Territory (1)
 (6)
 (2) 
Nouméa (1)
 (39)
 (1)

Guest (30)

 (3)
 (1)
 (2)
 (5)
 (11)
 (2)
 (6)
 (1)
 (1)
 (1)
 (1)
 (4)
 (4)
 (31)
 (1)
 (1)
 (17)
 (5)
 (2)
 (1)
 (1)
 (1)
 (87)
 (64)
 (1)
 (1)
 (7)
 (18)
 (47)
 (28)
 (1)

Athlete's death 
On 13 September 2018, Ukrainian football player Oleksandr Shcherbinin died of a heart attack in his hotel room at 6.45 am, after he complained of chest pain and collapsed.

See also 
 Asia Pacific Masters Games
 European Masters Games
 Pan-American Masters Games

References

External links 
 2018 Asia Pacific Masters Games
 https://web.archive.org/web/20180421031735/https://www.apmg2018.com/sport-list/
 https://web.archive.org/web/20190618182647/https://www.apmg2018.com/
 https://web.archive.org/web/20180315152102/https://www.apmg2018.com/

Masters Games
2018 in multi-sport events
2018 in Malaysian sport
Multi-sport events in Malaysia
Asia Pacific Masters Games